The Jenny Lake Trail is a  long hiking trail which circles Jenny Lake located in Grand Teton National Park in the U.S. state of Wyoming. The trail begins at the Jenny Lake campground or can be accessed at several other trailheads. One of the most popular and easiest hikes in the park, the trail provides pedestrian access to the Cascade Canyon Trail and is overlapped by the Valley Trail along the west side of Jenny Lake.

See also
List of hiking trails in Grand Teton National Park

References

Hiking trails of Grand Teton National Park